Rahem Ross Brown (March 20, 1970 – November 6, 2022), better known by his stage name Tame One, was an American hip hop recording artist and graffiti artist from New Jersey. He was a member of Artifacts, Leak Bros, and the hip-hop supergroup The Weathermen.

Musical career 
Tame One together with El Da Sensei released their "graffiti-honoring debut" album Between a Rock and a Hard Place in 1994, and a follow-up album That's Them in 1997.
Tame One has released two albums with the Artifacts, six solo albums, three mixtapes, and three collaborations one with former labelmate Cage as Leak Bros (Waterworld), one with Del The Funky Homosapien (Parallel Uni-verses) and The Revolution album with Dro Pesci and Nick Jackelson. He has worked with artists such as Aesop Rock, El-P, DJ Mr. Len, Breeze Brewin, Travis McCoy, Vast Aire, Yak Ballz, Hussein Fatal, Mos Def, Dro Pesci, The Mighty Rhino, Big Daddy Rap Beast, and KRS-One. He joined the underground supergroup the Weathermen which was formed in 2002 by Cage and El-P, and the same year he released his first solo album and EC debut named When Rappers Attack. His second solo album O.G. Bobby Johnson appeared in 2005. Next year he issued his next album called Slow Suicide Stimulus, a cooperative project with the Dusted Dons.

In July 2009 Tame One released a music video for his single "Anxiety Attacks", the video was directed by Derek Pike. Credited with making HipHop's first song about "Molly" (MDMA, the active ingredient in Ecstasy), at this time, Tame met Staten Island rapper Dro Pesci and producer Nick Jackelson. Together they recorded the yet-to-be-released album "The Revolution".

Brown also released a new EP for free download at slangcorp.com called "Hell or High Water", produced entirely by DJ Junkwaffel. He also worked on a reunion Artifacts album with El Da Sensei and DJKaos 1200 (2014) as well as promoting a Boom Skwad Recordings solo mix cd entitled "Skwadzilla".

Personal life and death 
Tame One was the first cousin of rapper Redman. He died from heart failure on November 6, 2022, at the age of 52.

Discography

Albums

Singles

Artifacts 
Between a Rock and a Hard Place (1994)
That's Them (1997)
That's Them: Lost Files 1989-1992 (2018)
Rare Collabs & Features (2019)
Best of... (2019)
No Expiration Date (2022) (with Buckwild)

The Weathermen 
"The Conspiracy" Mix CD Vol 1" (2003)

Leak Bros 
Waterworld (2004) (with Cage)

Slow Suicide Stimulus 
Slow Suicide Stimulus (2006) (with Dusted Dons)

Del the Funky Homosapien & Tame One 
Parallel Uni-Verses (2009)

Black Galactus & The Latino Silver Surfer 

Black Galactus & The Latino Silver Surfer (2018) (with Sol Zalez)

References

External links 
 Cyril Cordor. [ "Biography"], allmusic, undated. Link retrieved July 13, 2009.
 Tom Doggett. "Tame One:: Spazmatic:: Blazin' Records", rapreviews, March 28, 2006. Link retrieved July 13, 2009.
 Vincent Thomas. [ "Spazmatic"], allmusic, undated. Link retrieved July 13, 2009.
 Steve 'Flash' Juon. "Tame One :: When Rappers Attack :: Eastern Conference Records", previews, March 4, 2003. Link retrieved July 13, 2009.
 Jason MacNeil. [ "When Rappers Attack"], allmusic, undated. Link retrieved July 13, 2009.

1970 births
2022 deaths
African-American male rappers
Rappers from Newark, New Jersey
Underground rappers
21st-century American rappers
21st-century American male musicians
The Weathermen (hip hop group) members
21st-century African-American musicians
20th-century African-American people